Upper Stillwater may refer to:

Upper Stillwater, Maine
Upper Stillwater Reservoir, Utah
Upper Stillwater Lake, Montana

See also
Stillwater (disambiguation)